Bedonia (locally ) is a comune within the Province of Parma, in Emilia-Romagna, northern Italy.

History 

The communal territory was already settled during the Neolithic age, and later was a Roman colony, under the name of Bitunia.
From the 11th century it was a fief of the bishops of Piacenza, and later of the Malaspina. In 1257 it was included in the State of the Landi, to which it belonged until 1682, when it was confiscated by the Duchy of Parma.
During the Unification of Italy, the population was protagonist of an insurrectionary movement for the annexation of the country to Piedmont.
In recent times Bedonia has been given an important role as a remembrance community that contributed to the Partisan fights (during World War II).
In the life of Bedonia an important role of cultural promotion has been carried out from the Seminary, instituted in 1846 from Mons. Giovanni Agazzi and Stefano Grapnels.

Main sights 

The city, just a few miles away from Liguria, is characterized by colorful buildings of obvious Ligurian influence.
The city has two important churches: Sant'Antonino, a Baroque church in the historical center, and the Basilica della Madonna di San Marco, which is next to the Seminario Vescovile (built in 1846). In it there is a Planetarium, a Museum of Natural History, a Xylographic Exposition of the works of Romeo Musa, an Art Gallery and a gigantic National Library. A third church, the Oratorio dei Disciplinati, added its bell tower to the skyline of the town up until 1950. Due to issues related to the structure's alleged instability, the tower was demolished and the church was desecrated.   
The Sanctuary of the Madonna di S. Marco (Madonna of S. Mark), built in 1939, houses one wooden statue created in 1531 representing the Madonna with Child on throne.
The ancient Arc of Entrance to the old town is now being included in the breathtaking system of the "Peschiera Park". Also, in Via Trieste (Trieste street) there is an important historical building that shows the Landi family symbol. It's among the most important noble constructions in the whole valley of river Taro.

Of value are the natural resources and landscapes. North of the town, the Mountain Pelpi reaches , on top of which there is a huge cross. It is a pilgrimage site after a miracle of the Virgin Mary occurred over a century ago.
In the center of the village a river runs (Pelpirana) which converges a few miles after into the Taro River.

It is also a pilgrimage place and a suggestive rocky peak surrounded by green forests.

During recent years, many sporting structures have been built (swimming pool, camping, tennis fields, etc.).

Economy 

Tourism is important to the local economy. The area is dependent on summer tourists drawn by the natural environment of the surrounding countryside.

Amenities which support the local tourist economy include modern sports complexes (swimming-pools, tennis courts, volleyball and basketball courts, skating and football) and an equipped camping complex, which is situated on one of the hills in the area. The swimming pool is a major tourist attraction in the town.

Also available are mushroom picking opportunities which includes the world famous Porcino Valtarese.

People 
 Francesco Cura
 Franco Nero

References

External links 
 Bedonia Info
 Valtaro
 Community info
 Bedonia
 Valtaro info 

Cities and towns in Emilia-Romagna